University station is a station on the Metrorail rapid transit system at the University of Miami in Coral Gables, Florida. The station is located at 5400 Ponce de Leon Boulevard at the intersection of Dixie Highway (US 1) and Mariposa Court. 

The stop provides convenient transportation for University of Miami students, staff, and resident physicians traveling between the university's main campus in Coral Gables campus and the medical campus at the UM/Jackson Memorial Medical Center at Civic Center station in the Health District. It also offers direct access to Downtown Miami and Miami International Airport.

Thes station opened on May 20, 1984.

Station layout
The station has two tracks served by an island platform. Parking is located in a surface lot north of the station underneath the tracks.

References

External links

MDT – Metrorail Stations
 Station from Google Maps Street View

Green Line (Metrorail)
Orange Line (Metrorail)
Metrorail (Miami-Dade County) stations in Miami-Dade County, Florida
Buildings and structures in Coral Gables, Florida
Railway stations in the United States opened in 1984
1984 establishments in Florida
Railway stations in the United States at university and college campuses